In political science, the terms radical right and populist right have been used to refer to the range of nationalist, right-wing to far-right parties that have grown in support since the late 1970s in Europe. Populist right groups have shared a number of causes, which typically include opposition to globalisation and immigration, criticism of multiculturalism, and opposition to the European Union.

The ideological spectrum of the radical right extends from staunchly right-wing national conservatism and right-wing populism to far-right Third Positionism and neo-fascist ideologies.

Terminology and definition
The Friedrich Ebert Foundation, in a 2011 book, defines the terms "right-wing extremist" and "right-wing populist" differently.

In 1996, the Dutch political scientist Cas Mudde noted that in most European countries, the terms "radical right" and "extreme right" were used interchangeably. He cited Germany as an exception, noting that among political scientists in that nation, the term "radical right" (Rechsradikalismus) was used in reference to those right-wing groups which were outside the political mainstream but which did not threaten "the free democratic order"; the term was thus used in contrast to the "extreme right" (Rechsextremen), which referred to groups which did threaten the constitutionality of the state and could therefore be banned under German law. According to the German scientist Klaus Wahl "the radical right can be scaled by using different degrees of militancy and aggressiveness from right-wing populism to racism, terrorism, and totalitarianism".

The term "radical right" originated in U.S. political discourse, where it was applied to various anti-communist groups active in the 1950s era of McCarthyism. The term and accompanying concept then entered Western Europe through the social sciences. Conversely, the term "right-wing extremism" developed among European scholars, particularly those in Germany, to describe right-wing groups that developed in the decades following the Second World War, such as the West German National Democratic Party and the French Poujadists. This term then came to be adopted by some scholars in the U.S.

Defining Europe's populist right

In his study of the movement in Europe, David Art defined the term "radical right" as referring to "a specific type of far right party that began to emerge in the late 1970s"; as Art used it, "far right" was "an umbrella term for any political party, voluntary association, or extra-parliamentary movement that differentiates itself from the mainstream right". 
Most commentators have agreed that these varied radical right parties have a number of common characteristics.
Givens stated that the two characteristics shared by these radical rights groups were:
"They take an anti-immigrant stance by proposing stronger immigrant controls and the repatriation of unemployed immigrants, and they call for a national (i.e., citizens only) preference in social benefits and employment ("welfare chauvinism").
In contrast to earlier extreme right or fascist parties, they work within a country's political and electoral system. Although they do not have the goal of tearing down the current political system, they are anti-establishment. They consider themselves "outsiders" in the party system, and therefore not tainted by government or mainstream parties' scandals."

In 2000, Minkenberg characterised the "radical right" as "a political ideology, the core element of which is a myth of a homogeneous nation, a
romantic and populist ultranationalism which is directed against the concept of liberal and pluralistic democracy and its underlying principles of individualism and universalism. The contemporary radical right does not want to return to pre-democratic regimes such as monarchy or feudalism. It wants government by the people, but in terms of ethnocracy instead of democracy." In 2020, Wahl summarized that "ideologies of the radical right emphasize social and economic threats in the modern and postmodern world (e.g., globalization, immigration). The radical right also promises protection against such threats by an emphatic ethnic construction of 'we', the people, as a familiar, homogeneous in-group, anti-modern, or reactionary structures of family, society, an authoritarian state, nationalism, the discrimination, or exclusion of immigrants and other minorities ... While favoring traditional social and cultural structures (traditional family and gender roles, religion, etc.) the radical right uses modern technologies and does not ascribe to a specific economic policy; some parties tend toward a liberal, free-market policy, and others more to a welfare state policy."

Journalist Nick Robins-Early characterised the European radical right as focusing on "sometimes vitriolic anti-Euro, anti-immigrant sentiment, as well as renewed security fears" within European nations. According to political scientist Andrej Zaslove, populist radical right parties "employ an anti‐state, anti‐bureaucratic, anti‐elite, anti‐European Union political message."

The European migrant crisis has caused a significant uptick in the populist support for right-wing parties. A 2016 article in the New York Times argued that the "once-unthinkable" British vote to leave the EU is the result of "Populist anger against the established political order".

Support base

The 2005 paper in the European Journal of Political Research argues that the two groups most likely to vote for populist right parties are "blue-collar workers – who support extensive state intervention in the economy – and owners of small businesses – who are against such state intervention".

A 2014 article by the Friedrich Ebert Foundation argued that economic inequality is growing the gap "between the winners of globalisation and its losers. The first group live in urban areas, have relatively stable jobs and access to modern communications and transport, but fears nevertheless that it will soon share the fate of the second group. The second group, meanwhile, are threatened by unemployment or stuck in poorly paid and precarious jobs. They belong to the working class or consider themselves part of the lower middle class and fear  – for themselves or their children – (further) social decline. Such people live in de-industrialised areas, or rural or semi-urban areas, on the periphery of globalised metropolises to which they have no access."

Scholars have argued that neoliberalism has led to European "social and economic insecurity" in the working and middle classes, leading to the growth of right wing populism.

Minkenberg termed the supporters of the radical right "modernization losers", in that they are from the sectors of society whose "social and cultural capital is shrinking and they are intent on defending it against encroachments on their traditional entitlements." He described this base as those who exhibit "unease, rigid thinking, authoritarian attitudes and traditional values — all of which reinforce each other."

Connections and links

A number of radical right elements express a desire for fascist or neo-Nazi rule in Europe.

Political scientist Michael Minkenberg stressed that the radical right was "a modern phenomenon", stating that it is only "vaguely connected" to previous right-wing movements because it has "undergone a phase of renewal, as a result of social and cultural modernisation shifts in post-war Europe." As such he opined that describing it using terms such as "fascism" or "neo-fascism", which were closely linked the right-wing movements of the early 20th century, was an "increasingly obsolete" approach.

Minkenberg argued that the radical right groups in Eastern Europe, including in Eastern Germany, were distinct from their counterparts in Western Europe. He added that "the East European radical right is more reverse-oriented than its Western counterpart, i.e. more antidemocratic and more militant" and that because of the relatively new establishment of liberal democracy in Eastern Europe, violence still could be used as a political tool by the Eastern radical right.

Jeffrey Kaplan and Leonard Weinberg's 1998 book The Emergence of a Euro-American Radical Right says that populist right wing movements are supported by extra-parliamentary groups with electorally unpalatable views, such as Christian Identity movements, anti-Semitic conspiracy theories, the promotion of scientific racism and Holocaust denial, and neo-Nazi economic theories like Strasserism.

Connection to U.S. radical right

In 1998, the political scientists Jeffrey Kaplan and Leonard Weinberg argued that the interaction of right-wingers and the transmission of ideas between right-wing groups in Western Europe and the United States was common, having been aided by the development of the internet. They believed that in the late 20th century a discernible "Euro-American radical right" that would promote a trans-national white identity politics, promoting populist grievance narratives around groups who feel besieged by non-white peoples through multiculturalism. This concept of a unified "white" race was not always explicitly racialist, in many cases instead being conceived of as being a bond created by "cultural affinity and a sense of common historical experience and a shared ultimate destiny".

Kaplan and Weinberg also identified differences in the radical right movements of Europe and North America. They noted that European radical right parties had been able to achieve electoral successes in a way that their American counterparts had failed to do. Instead, radical right activists in the U.S. had attempted to circumvent the restrictions of the two-party system by joining right-wing trends within the Republican Party. They also noted that legal restrictions on such groups differed in the two continents; in the U.S., the First Amendment protected the free speech of radical right groups, while in most West European nations there were laws prohibiting hate speech and (in several countries) Holocaust denial, thus forcing European radical right groups to present a more moderate image.

The election of President Donald Trump in the United States has drawn praise from the European radical right, and following his election, connections were expanded, with Trump's National Security Advisor Michael Flynn meeting with the Freedom Party of Austria, and former White House Chief Strategist Steve Bannon founding The Movement, a network intended to advance European radical right causes. Trump also initially made supportive remarks towards Marine Le Pen's candidacy in the 2017 French presidential election.

Other international connections

Some radical right parties, such as the French National Rally, the Alternative for Germany, the Dutch Forum for Democracy, the Freedom Party of Austria, the Italian Northern League the Bulgarian Attack and the Hungarian Jobbik have cultivated relations with the Russian government. The Freedom Party of Austria  and Northern League  have signed cooperation agreements with the ruling party of Russia, United Russia. Russia has also been accused of providing assistance to several radical right parties in Europe.

In 2019, several radical right parties participated in the only permitted international delegation in Kashmir following the revocation of the special status of Jammu and Kashmir, on the invitation of India's Bharatiya Janata Party (BJP) government. The parties that participated included the National Rally, the Northern League, the Alternative for Germany, the Spanish Vox, the British Brexit Party, the Polish Law and Justice and the Belgian Vlaams Belang. This was described by Eviaine Leidig in Foreign Policy as evidence of growing connections between the radical right in Europe and Hindutva supporters in India. The Fidesz government in Hungary has also expressed support for India on Kashmir and the Citizenship Amendment Act protests. The BJP previously established a relationship with the Jobbik party in Hungary.

Many radical right parties, including Vlaams Belang, Attack, the Freedom Party of Austria and the Sweden Democrats, have sought improved ties with Israel and its ruling party, Likud, in an effort to counter accusations of anti-Semitism domestically. Israeli Prime Minister Benjamin Netanyahu has cultivated these relationships, particularly with the Northern League and Hungary under Fidesz, in order to build international support for Israeli policies. Likud's foreign affairs director endorsed a vote for Vox in the April 2019 Spanish general election on behalf of his party, before backtracking and claiming it was only a personal endorsement. Netanyahu's son, Yair Netanyahu, later wished luck to Fidesz leader Viktor Orban, Brexit Party leader Nigel Farage, Northern League leader Matteo Salvini and Dutch Party for Freedom leader Geert Wilders in the 2019 European Parliament election.

Arab states including Egypt, Syria, the United Arab Emirates and Saudi Arabia have been described as courting ties with the European radical right in recent years, based on shared concerns towards the rise of Islamism. In the past, radical right parties had also developed relationships with Ba'athist Iraq, the Libyan Arab Jamahiriya and the government of Morocco. In 2011, politicians from the Freedom Party of Austria were involved in arranging clandestine peace talks between Libya's Saif al-Islam Gaddafi and Israel's Ayoob Kara.

The Justice and Development Party and Nationalist Movement Party, which together form the ruling government coalition in Turkey, have developed ties with Jobbik, inviting leading Jobbik members to their events. However, most radical right parties in Europe, such as the Northern League, National Rally and Greek Solution, hold strongly anti-Turkish views. The leader of the predecessor of the National Rally, the National Front, Jean-Marie Le Pen, had a friendship with Welfare Party leader Necmettin Erbakan, based on their shared right-wing nationalism and their belief that it was impossible to combine Islamic and Christian civilization.

The former dictator of the Central African Republic, Jean-Bédel Bokassa, received extensive support from the National Front, and let the party use his castle in France as a training facility.

The People's Mujahedin of Iran has been accused of providing financial support to Vox, through donations sent via the National Council of Resistance of Iran.

Following the election of Jair Bolsonaro as President of Brazil in 2018, the Brazilian government has developed close ties with radical right parties in Hungary, Italy and Poland.

Connections to extra-parliamentary right-wing groups

Alongside the radical right political parties, there are also extra-parliamentary groups which – having no need to express views that will be electorally palatable – are able to express a more heterogenous array of right-wing views.
These extra-parliamentary rightist groups are often religious in nature, affiliated either with Christian Identity or with Odinism, reflecting a greater racial mysticism than was present in earlier right-wing movements. Such groups often believe that Western governments are under the control of a Zionist Occupation Government (ZOG), thus expressing explicitly anti-Semitic views. Such groups are also less enthusiastic about capitalism and free markets as the radical right political parties are, instead being influenced by Strasserism and favouring greater state control of the economy.
Such extra-parliamentary groups often exhibit ritual or ceremonial practices to commemorate perceived past achievements of the right-wing, for instance by marking Adolf Hitler's birthday or the death date of Rudolf Hess. They are also associated with violent activities, with such violence often being utilised not just for political aims but also as an expressive and enjoyable activity.

There are also more intellectually-oriented radical right organisations which hold conferences and publish journals devoted to the promotion of scientific racism and Holocaust denial. Material promoting Holocaust denial is typically published in the United Kingdom or United States and then smuggled into continental Europe, where the publication of such material is widely illegal.

Examples
A 2015 study on modern populism by Kirk A. Hawkins of Brigham Young University used human coding to rate the level of perceived populist rhetoric in party manifestos and political speeches. Parties with high populism scores included the British National Party, the Swiss People's Party, the National Democratic Party of Germany, the National Rally, the People's Party, the National Democracy, the Sweden Democrats, the Party for Freedom and Forum for Democracy, and the Law and Justice and United Poland parties.

The political scientists Robert Ford and Matthew Goodwin characterised the UK Independence Party as being on the radical right.

See also

Alliance for Peace and Freedom
Alternative for Germany
Der Flügel
Alt-right
Antisemitism in Europe 
Britain First
British National Party
Congress of the New Right
Conservative People's Party of Estonia
Eurabia
Europe of Nations and Freedom
European New Right
Falange Española de las JONS
Far-right politics
Far-right subcultures
Fascism
Fascism in Europe
Fidesz, Hungary
Golden Dawn, Greece
Great Replacement
Identitarian movement
Kalergi Plan
Lega Nord
List of active nationalist parties in Europe
List of fascist movements
List of fascist movements by country
Movement for a Europe of Nations and Freedom
National conservatism
National Rally
Nazism
Neo-fascism
Neo-nationalism
Neo-Nazism
Nordicism
Our Homeland Movement, Hungary
Party for Freedom
Party of the Swedes
Pro Germany Citizens' Movement
Racism in Europe
Radical right (United States)
Right-wing populism
Right-wing terrorism
Terrorism in Europe
The Radical Right in Western Europe
Turning Point UK
UK Independence Party
Uyoku dantai, Japan
Vlaams Belang
White nationalism
White genocide conspiracy theory
White supremacy

References

Footnotes

Sources

 
 
 
 
 
 
 
 
 
 
 
 
 
 
 
 
 
 
 

Conservatism in Europe
Euroscepticism
 
Far-right terrorism
National conservatism
Nationalist terrorism in Europe
Neo-fascism
New Right (Europe)
Pan-European nationalism
Right-wing populism in Europe
Third Position
White nationalism in Europe